Thanasi Kokkinakis and Matt Reid were the defending champions but only Reid chose to defend his title, partnering Jonny O'Mara. Reid lost in the first round to Egor Gerasimov and Li Zhe.

Marcelo Arévalo and Miguel Ángel Reyes-Varela won the title after defeating Nathan Pasha and Max Schnur 5–7, 6–3, [10–8] in the final.

Seeds

Draw

References

External links
 Main draw

Nordic Naturals Challenger - Doubles
2019 Doubles